The 1973 Tour de Corse (formally the 17th Tour de Corse) was the thirteenth round of inaugural World Rally Championship season. Run in December in the County of Corsica in France, the rally was run primarily on tarmac. Jean-Pierre Nicolas won the round with co-driver Michel Vial.

Report 
In 1973, World Rally Championship finished with the Tour de Corse in Corsica. The race had 22 rounds, with Jean-Pierre Nicolas winning the majority of rounds.

Alpine, Ford, Opel, Porsche, Alfa Romeo and Audi finished in the points.

Results

Championship standings after the event

References

External links 
 Official website of the World Rally Championship
 1973 Tour de Corse at Rallye-info 

Tour de Corse